Bobcat Bite is a restaurant that is located in Santa Fe, New Mexico, off of the Old Las Vegas Highway. The location itself has hosted two businesses, both of which have gone by the name "Bobcat Bite". The original Bobcat Bite specialized in the preparation of steak, chops, and hamburgers.

Origins 
The historic building that housed Bobcat Bite was originally a trading post. It later became a gun shop, until Rene Clayton and her daughter, Mitzi Clayton/Panzer, converted it into a restaurant. The Bobcat Bite has been variously featured in newspapers, television, and other such media, and has been referred to by said media as "...the place to go for a green chili cheeseburger."

The name of the establishment is in reference to alleged accounts that tell of bobcats descending from the surrounding hills so as to visit "bobcat-friendly" diners, which would, reportedly, serve the animals fresh scraps of food.

Reception 

During its time under the Eckre family's management, Bobcat Bite was well-known among the citizens, visitors, and tourists of Santa Fe, New Mexico, and has been named in several articles, including those contained within the Albuquerque Journal, the Chicago Tribune, and The New York Times.  Bobcat Bite also appeared in the 2004 documentary Hamburger America, and was mentioned in the Food Network's program, "Top American Restaurants: Bon Appétit picks the best", hosted by Alton Brown, in 2007. Bobcat Bite was featured in the 2012 episode "New Mexico" on Bizarre Foods America. Host Andrew Zimmern ranks it in his top 3 hamburgers.

Awards 

Bobcat Bite's burgers, specifically the green chili cheeseburger, have won awards including:

GQ magazine listed Bobcat Bite at #12 on its list of "The 20 Hamburgers You Must Eat Before you Die".
The Santa Fe Reporter awarded Bobcat Bite with "Best Burger" in 2002, 2003, and 2004.

Status 
As of June 9, 2013, the original Bobcat Bite is closed. Former owners Bonnie & John Eckre opened a new restaurant known as Santa Fe Bite in August 2013. It closed in October 2018, but re-opened in a new location in Santa Fe in late 2019, in combination with an additional location in Albuquerque.

See also 

 List of hamburger restaurants

References

External links 

Restaurants in New Mexico
Hamburger restaurants
Steakhouses in the United States
Culture of Santa Fe, New Mexico
Restaurants established in 1953
1953 establishments in New Mexico